Banco BMG is one of Brazil's major retail banks. The bank, formerly known as Banco de Minas Gerais S.A., was founded in 1930.

Banco BMG had a minority share in a joint venture with Brazil’s Itaú Unibanco, called Itau BMG Consignado, which lent to customers who hold payroll accounts, until December 2016 when Itau bought BMG's remaining share.

References

External links
 Official Website

Banks of Brazil